Jalangkote (Lontara: ᨍᨒᨃᨚᨈᨙ) is a South Sulawesi fried dumpling from Indonesian cuisine, stuffed with rice vermicelli, vegetables, potatoes and eggs. Spicy, sweet and sour sauce will be dipped into prior to be eaten. This pastry is popular in Makassarese cuisine of Makassarese and Buginese, also specialty of South Sulawesi, Indonesia. Jalangkote almost similar to pastel and panada.

See also

Kue
List of Indonesian dishes
List of Indonesian snacks

References

 
Stuffed dishes
Indonesian cuisine
Deep fried foods